Vuyolwethu Zungula is a South African politician who is the president of the African Transformation Movement (ATM). He and Thandiswa Marawu have been representing the ATM in the National Assembly of South Africa since 22 May 2019. Zungula was born in Mthatha and has a degree from Nelson Mandela University. At the time of the election, he was working towards an honours degree from the University of South Africa.

References

External links
Vuyolwethu Zungula – People's Assembly
Mr Vuyolwethu Zungula – Parliament of South Africa

Living people
Year of birth missing (living people)
Members of the National Assembly of South Africa
People from the Eastern Cape
Xhosa people
People from Mthatha
Nelson Mandela University alumni
African Transformation Movement politicians